Jonathan George Boston  (born 1957) is a New Zealand academic and professor of policy studies at the Victoria University of Wellington School of Government.

Academic career
Boston got his MA from the University of Canterbury and his DPhil from the University of Oxford.

He was the co-chair of the Expert Advisory Group on Solutions to Child Poverty, and has written extensively on climate change policy.

In the 2021 New Year Honours, Boston was appointed an Officer of the New Zealand Order of Merit, for services to public and social policy.

Selected works 
 Boston, Jonathan, John Martin, June Pallot, and Pat Walsh. Public management: the New Zealand model. Auckland: Oxford University Press, 1996.
 Boston, Jonathan, John Martin, June Pallot, and Pat Walsh. "Reshaping the state: New Zealand’s bureaucratic revolution." Victoria University of Wellington Print (1991).
 Boston, Jonathan. "The theoretical underpinnings of public sector restructuring in New Zealand." Reshaping the state (1991): 1-26.
 Boston, Jonathan. The state under contract. Paul & Company Pub Consortium, 1995.

References

External links
 Staff page at Victoria University of Wellington
 Author page at Bridget William Books
 LinkedIn profile

Living people
Academic staff of the Victoria University of Wellington
University of Canterbury alumni
Alumni of the University of Oxford
1957 births
New Zealand political scientists
People from Wellington City
Officers of the New Zealand Order of Merit